John Richard Dellenback (November 6, 1918 – December 7, 2002) was a Republican U.S. congressman from Oregon.

Born in Chicago, Illinois, Dellenback's maternal grandparents were Norwegian and his paternal grandparents were each from Alsace-Lorraine and Germany. After graduating from Yale University, he served in the United States Navy during World War II, then received his law degree from the University of Michigan in 1949 and began teaching law at Oregon State College (later Oregon State University) that same year.

In 1960, Dellenback was elected to the Oregon House of Representatives, and in 1966, was elected to the United States House of Representatives, representing Oregon's 4th congressional district. While in Congress, Dellenback, a Republican, earned a reputation as an independent thinker. He wrote legislation to establish the Oregon Dunes National Recreation Area, worked to pass a bill that made pipeline permit-holders and shippers liable for oil spills, and supported federal Title IX legislation for equal opportunity for boys and girls in athletics.

Dellenback served four terms in the House and was defeated in the 1974 elections by liberal Democrat Jim Weaver. Dellenback's defeat is largely attributed to the anti-Republican mood of the electorate in the wake of the Watergate scandal.

After leaving Congress, Dellenback was appointed by President Gerald Ford as director of the Peace Corps, where he served from 1975 to 1977. From 1977 to 1988, Dellenback was president of the Christian College Coalition (now called the Council for Christian Colleges & Universities.

Dellenback died in Medford, Oregon of viral pneumonia in 2002.

To date, he is the last Republican to serve as representative from Oregon’s 4th congressional district.

References

External links 

1918 births
2002 deaths
20th-century American politicians
United States Navy personnel of World War II
American people of German descent
American people of Norwegian descent
Republican Party members of the Oregon House of Representatives
Oregon lawyers
Oregon State University faculty
Peace Corps directors
Politicians from Chicago
Republican Party members of the United States House of Representatives from Oregon
University of Michigan Law School alumni
Yale University alumni
Deaths from pneumonia in Oregon
20th-century American lawyers